Tenmile Creek is a stream in the U.S. state of West Virginia. It is a tributary of Buckhannon River.

See also
List of rivers of West Virginia

References

Rivers of Upshur County, West Virginia
Rivers of West Virginia